Abiodun Abioye (born 21 November 1992) is a Nigerian cricketer. He played in the 2016 ICC World Cricket League Division Five tournament in Jersey. In September 2018, he was named in Nigeria's squad for the 2018 Africa T20 Cup. He made his Twenty20 debut for Nigeria in the 2018 Africa T20 Cup on 14 September 2018.

In May 2019, he was named in Nigeria's squad for the Regional Finals of the 2018–19 ICC T20 World Cup Africa Qualifier tournament in Uganda. He made his Twenty20 International (T20I) debut for Nigeria against Kenya on 20 May 2019.

In October 2019, he was named in Nigeria's squad for the 2019 ICC T20 World Cup Qualifier tournament in the United Arab Emirates. However, on 24 October 2019, the International Cricket Council (ICC) announced that his bowling action was found to be illegal. He was suspended from bowling in international cricket matches until an assessment shows that his bowling action is legal.

References

External links
 

1992 births
Living people
Nigerian cricketers
Nigeria Twenty20 International cricketers